Abner Reid McClelan (January 4, 1831 – January 30, 1917) was a Canadian senator and the tenth Lieutenant Governor of New Brunswick.

Born in Riverside-Albert, New Brunswick, the son of Peter McClelan and Lucy (Robinson) McLelan, he was educated at Mount Allison Wesleyan Academy in Sackville, (now Mount Allison University). He was elected to the Legislative Assembly of New Brunswick in 1854 and served until confederation in 1867 when he was called to the Senate of Canada for the senatorial division of New Brunswick. A Liberal, he resigned in 1896 when he was appointed Lieutenant Governor of New Brunswick. He served until 1902. McClelan died in Moncton, New Brunswick in 1917.

References

 
 

1831 births
1917 deaths
Canadian senators from New Brunswick
Liberal Party of Canada senators
Lieutenant Governors of New Brunswick
New Brunswick Liberal Association MLAs
People from Albert County, New Brunswick
Mount Allison University alumni